Mahana is a settlement in the Tasman District of New Zealand's upper South Island.

Education

References

Populated places in the Tasman District